Itabaiana may refer to:

Itabaiana, a municipality located in the Brazilian state of Sergipe
Associação Olímpica de Itabaiana, a football club based there
Itabaiana Coritiba Foot Ball Clube, a football club based there
Itabaiana, Paraiba, a municipality located in the Brazilian state of Paraiba